The Link Centre is a leisure centre in Swindon, England. The building, owned by Swindon Borough Council and operated by Greenwich Leisure under the brand "Better", is best known for its national-sized ice rink which houses a National Ice Hockey League team, the Swindon Wildcats.

Location
The complex includes a large Asda supermarket.

History
The centre was first commissioned by Thamesdown Borough Council (later renamed Swindon Borough Council) in 1970 to provide leisure and social facilities for an estimated West Swindon population of 50,000. Design was undertaken in-house under chief architect K P Sherry and work began on the site in 1983.

The space-age, multi-axial design incorporating an ice rink, swimming pool and other facilities opened in April 1985, received an estimated 1 million visitors in its first year of operation and "won awards and favourable mentions in architectural circles."

"The complex, designed to provide facilities for more than 20 sports and leisure activities, was described in architectural and sports journals as the most comprehensive development of its kind in Britain. Among the early visitors who came to Swindon specially to see it was Richard Tracey, who was Sports Minister in Margaret Thatcher's government."

The £2million ice rink was praised on completion but local residents were unhappy that the swimming pool, at only 25 metres long, was not of competition standard.

In 2003, the centre was closed following the finding of the legionella bacteria in the water cooling system. This bacteria, found during a routine test, is the cause of Legionnaires' disease. The Link Centre re-opened following a full sterilisation of the water supply. In 2007 the metal-exterior centre was closed by a major electrical fault caused by an internal flood.

Facilities
 Ice rink 
The international-sized (56mx26m) ice pad is recognised as a "Centre of Excellence" for both figure skating and ice hockey. It is an approved national centre for squad training for British Ice Skating and Ice Hockey UK, and a NISA approved regional test centre.
 25m deck level swimming pool
 Gym with over 100 stations and Astroturf area
 Dedicated spin studio
 2 fitness class studios
 1,100 square metre trampoline park
 Squash courts
 Library

Ice hockey teams

A number of ice hockey teams play at the Link Centre. These include:

 Swindon Wildcats
 Swindon Wildcats 2
 Swindon Wildcats Rec
 Swindon Topcats
 Swindon Avalanche

References

External links
 
 The Link Centre at SwindonWeb.com

Buildings and structures in Swindon
Sports venues in Swindon
Indoor ice hockey venues in England
Ice rinks in the United Kingdom